Mikhail Ivanovich An (February 19, 1952 – August 11, 1979) was a Soviet football player of Korean ethnic origin. An was one of the FC Pakhtakor Tashkent players killed in the 1979 Dniprodzerzhynsk mid-air collision.

In 2020, a documentary was made about him, "Misha" by Brian Song.

International career
An made his debut for USSR on September 6, 1978 in a friendly against Iran and also played in a UEFA Euro 1980 qualifier against Greece.

External links
 Profile on RussiaTeam.ru 
 Career Statistics on KLISF

References

1952 births
1979 deaths
Association football midfielders
Soviet footballers
Uzbekistani footballers
Soviet Union international footballers
Soviet Top League players
Pakhtakor Tashkent FK players
Koryo-saram
Uzbekistani people of Korean descent
Victims of aviation accidents or incidents in the Soviet Union
Victims of aviation accidents or incidents in Ukraine
Soviet people of Korean descent